"Born Free" is a popular song with music by John Barry and lyrics by Don Black. It was written for the 1966 film of the same name and won an Academy Award for Best Original Song.

Original version 
The song's composers, John Barry and Don Black, asked British singer Matt Monro, who was managed by Black at the time, to record the song for the film's soundtrack. The producers of the film considered the song uncommercial, however, and deleted it from the print shown at its Royal Command premiere in London. When Monro, who attended the event, made Black aware of the edit, they successfully lobbied the producers to restore it. Monro's interpretation appeared over the closing credits in a shortened version recorded especially for the film, which enabled it to qualify for the Academy Award. Monro's complete commercial recording was released on the film's soundtrack album and became the singer's signature tune for the remainder of his career.

Charted versions 
Matt Monro's version never charted. However, Roger Williams recorded a cover which was noted for its use of a male chorus, heard in the second half of the song after the instrumental section. The song reached number seven on the Billboard Hot 100 and number one on the Adult contemporary chart for six non-consecutive weeks in September/October 1966

The r&b group the Hesitations recorded a cover that peaked at #38 on the US Billboard Hot 100 in 1968.

"Born Free" also appeared on the Vic Reeves album I Will Cure You. Released as a single, this version peaked at #6 in the UK Singles Chart in 1991.

See also
List of number-one adult contemporary singles of 1966 (U.S.)

References

External links
 George Adamson information website with photos, letters and much information and featuring Elsa the Lioness.

1966 songs
1966 singles
1973 singles
1991 singles
Film theme songs
British pop songs
Matt Monro songs
Andy Williams songs
Ike & Tina Turner songs
Frank Sinatra songs
Ed Ames songs
Songs with lyrics by Don Black (lyricist)
Songs with music by John Barry (composer)
Best Original Song Academy Award-winning songs
Capitol Records singles
United Artists Records singles